Uraman District is a district (bakhsh) in Sarvabad County, Kurdistan Province, Iran. At the 2006 census, its population was 10,500, in 2,360 families.  The District has no cities. The District has two rural districts (dehestan): Shalyar Rural District and Uraman Takht Rural District.

References 

Sarvabad County
Districts of Kurdistan Province